The Abbot of Cambuskenneth or Abbot of Stirling (later Commendator of Cambuskenneth) was the head of the Arrouaisian (Augustinian) monastic community of Cambuskenneth Abbey, near Stirling. The long history of the abbey came to a formal end when the abbey was turned into a secular lordship for the last commendator, Alexander Erskine.

The following is a list of abbots and commendators:

List of abbots
 William, 1147–1150
 Isaac, 1152/1153
 Alured, 1152/1153–1171/1178
 Nicholas, 1171/1182–1195
 William, 1207–1235
 Peter, 1235–1240
 Richard, 1253–1269
 Richard Grossus, 1269
 John, 1287–1292
 Patrick, 1295–1296
 Michael, 1307
 Gilbert, 1308/1310
 Fergus, 1311
 John, 1336
 John de Kincardine, 1336
 William, 1342
 Adam, 1350
 Gilbert, 1362–1363
 William de Blackburn, 1390–1398
 Patrick de Callendar, 1401–1434
 David White, 1439–1443
 David Kelly (Celle), 1445–1462
 John, 1465
 Henry Abercrombie, 1466–1502
 Alexander Ruch (Ruthven), x 1469
 David Arnot, 1503–1509
 Andrew MacBreck, 1509–1511/1513
 Patrick Paniter (Painter), 1513–1519
 Alexander Mylne, 1519–1548

List of commendators
 David Paniter, 1549–1558
 Adam Erskine, 1562–1605
 Alexander Livingstone, 1585
 Alexander Erskine, 1608–1617

Notes

Bibliography
 Cowan, Ian B. & Easson, David E., Medieval Religious Houses: Scotland With an Appendix on the Houses in the Isle of Man, Second Edition, (London, 1976), pp. 89–90
 Watt, D.E.R. & Shead, N.F. (eds.), The Heads of Religious Houses in Scotland from the 12th to the 16th Centuries, The Scottish Records Society, New Series, Volume 24, (Edinburgh, 2001), pp. 24–8

See also
 Cambuskenneth Abbey

Arrouaisians
History of Stirling (council area)
People associated with Stirling (council area)
Scottish abbots
Lists of abbots